Charles Powell Adams (March 3, 1831 –  November 2, 1893 was a Colonel in the Union Army, physician and politician.

Charles Powell Adams was a doctor when he was elected to the Minnesota territorial chamber on October 14, 1856. When the civil war began he entered the Union army as a Captain in the 1st Minnesota Volunteer Infantry. He was promoted to major on October 22, 1861 and to Lieutenant Colonel 11 months later. During the Battle of Gettysburg he participated in the attacks of the 1st Minnesota Volunteer Infantry and was wounded by three cannonballs next to Colonel Colvill. After mustering out on May 4, 1864, he reenlisted in Hatch's Battalion, Minnesota Volunteer Cavalry with the rank of Major. It conducted operations against Northwestern Indians. He was brevetted brigadier   general on Sept. 5, 1864 and left the active service June 22, 1866.

Colonel Adams died on November 2, 1893 in Vermillion, Minnesota and is buried in Hastings.

External links 
For translation from French to English on the article on Charles Powell Adams
:fr:Charles Powell Adams

1831 births
1893 deaths
Union Army officers